Zhu Jingjing (born 7 January 1985) is a Chinese badminton player. Born in Shashi, Hubei, Zhu joined the Guangdong team in 1999, and was selected to join the national team in 2001. She was part of the national junior team that competed at the 2002 Asian Junior Championships, winning the gold medal in the girls' team event, and a bronze medal in the singles event. Zhu then suffered lumbar hernia during exercise, and was sent back to Guangdong. Zhu who played for the Guangdong team, became the runner-up at the 2006 National Championships, and was called back to join the national team. In the international event, she was the champion at the 2007 Vietnam Open.

Achievements

Asian Junior Championships 
Girls' singles

BWF Superseries 
The BWF Superseries has two level such as Superseries and Superseries Premier. A season of Superseries features twelve tournaments around the world, which introduced since 2011, with successful players invited to the Superseries Finals held at the year end.

Women's Singles

 BWF Superseries Finals tournament
 BWF Superseries Premier tournament
 BWF Superseries tournament

BWF Grand Prix 
The BWF Grand Prix has two level such as Grand Prix and Grand Prix Gold. It is a series of badminton tournaments, sanctioned by Badminton World Federation (BWF) since 2007. The World Badminton Grand Prix sanctioned by International Badminton Federation (IBF) since 1983.

Women's singles

 BWF Grand Prix Gold tournament
 BWF & IBF Grand Prix tournament

BWF International Challenge/Series 
Women's singles

 BWF International Challenge tournament
 BWF International Series tournament

References

External links 
 

1985 births
Living people
Badminton players from Hubei
Chinese female badminton players